Colleen Cutschall, (born 1951) also known as Sister Wolf, is an Oglala-Sicangu Lakota artist from Pine Ridge, South Dakota, who works in Manitoba.

Biography 
Colleen Cutschall is a Lakota artist, art historian, educator, writer, activist, and curator from Pine Ridge, South Dakota, who has lived and worked in Southwestern Manitoba since the 1980s. She holds a Bachelor of Fine Arts from Barat College and an Master of Education from Black Hills State University. Cutschall works in Painting, Sculpture, Photography, and Installation art. Some themes of her work include Lakota mythological archetypes, human relationships to the cosmos, and the implications of exploration. Her work is described as being flexible and situational and incorporating elements of anthropology, feminism, natural sciences, and cultural identity.

Colleen Cutschall's work is in the permanent collection of the Manitoba Arts Council Art Bank, the Canada Council Art Bank, the Government of Manitoba, Thunder Bay Art Gallery, Kenderdine Art Gallery, MacKenzie Art Gallery, Oscar Howe Art Center, and the Winnipeg Art Gallery.

Cutschall is known for designing the sculpture Spirit Warriors, installed at Little Bighorn Battlefield National Monument. This iron sculpture at the Little Bighorn Battlefield National Monument, which was until 1991 named after George Custer, United States Commander in the American Indian Wars. Cutschall's sculpture commemorates Native American warriors in the Great Sioux War of 1876.

University career 
In addition to maintaining her studio practice, Colleen Cutschall is Professor Emerita at Brandon University. After over twenty years of teaching at Brandon University in the Department of Native Studies, she founded the Department of Visual and Aboriginal Art.

Significant exhibitions 
 "Voices in the Blood," Art Gallery of Southwestern Manitoba, 1990. Toured to the Oscar Howe Art Center, Dakota Gallery; Minnesota State University, South Dakota; the Art Gallery of Mississauga; the Thunder Bay Art Gallery; the MacKenzie Art Gallery; and more.
 "Sister Wolf in Her Moon," Thunder Bay Art Gallery, 1995.
 "House Made of Stars," Winnipeg Art Gallery, 1996.
 "Identity By Design: Tradition, Change and Celebration in Native Women's Dresses," March 24, 2007 - August 3, 2008, National Museum of the American Indian, Washington, D.C.; and September 26, 2008 - February 7, 2010, National Museum of the American Indian, New York, NY, at the George Gustav Heye Center. Colleen Cutschall also wrote a chapter, Dress, Designers, and the Dance of Life, for a book which accompanied the exhibition.
"….Dies Again!," Urban Shaman, May 27, 2005 - July 2, 2005, Winnipeg, Manitoba.

References 
 
 

Canadian women artists
First Nations artists
1951 births
Living people
Oglala people
Native American women artists
American emigrants to Canada
Black Hills State University alumni
Academic staff of Brandon University
Native American artists
American women academics